Cod Music is a record label that aims at new musicians. It was founded in 2006.

Musicians
Bang Gang
Lay Low
Dr Mister & Mr Handsome
Benny Crespo's Gang
Merzedes Club
Steini
Wulfgang
Disa

External links
Cod Music Website
Cod Music on Myspace

References 

Icelandic record labels